Alexander Fyodori Miasnikian or Myasnikov (28 January [9 February] 1886 – 22 March 1925), also known by his revolutionary nom de guerre Martuni, was an Armenian Bolshevik revolutionary, military leader and politician. During the Russian Civil War, he served as First Secretary of the Communist Party of Byelorussia from 1918 to 1919. As the Chairman of the Council of People's Commissars of Armenia from 1921 to 1922, he is credited with rebuilding the Armenian republic at the beginning of Lenin's New Economic Policy (NEP).

Biography
Miasnikian was born in the Armenian-populated city of New Nakhichevan (now a part of Rostov-on-Don) to the family of a merchant. He graduated from the faculty of law of Moscow University in 1911. As a student in New Nakhichevan and later in Moscow, Miasnikian was active in underground groups starting in 1901. He took part in the 1905 Russian Revolution and joined the Russian Social Democratic Labour Party in 1906. He was arrested and exiled to Baku that same year.

Between 1912 and 1914, Miasnikian worked as an assistant to a lawyer in Moscow while continuing his political activities. After the start of World War I in 1914, he was drafted into the Russian Army. He was a member of an underground party cell in the army and promoted revolutionary ideas among the soldiers.

After the February Revolution of 1917, Miasnikian became a member of the Western Front's military committee, leading its Bolshevik faction together with Mikhail Frunze. He also served as the editor of the Bolshevik newspaper Zvezda in Minsk. He was elected a delegate to the 6th Congress of the Bolshevik Party (August 1917). In September 1917, he was elected chairman of the Northwestern Regional Committee of the Bolshevik Party (the predecessor of the Bolshevik party organization in Byelorussia). After the October Revolution, he was elected chairman the Revolutionary Military Committee of the Northwestern Front. Miasnikian was then elected commander of the Western Front at the soldiers' congress of deputies.

Despite being an active opponent of the idea of a Byelorussian autonomy, in 1918, he was appointed the first chairman of the Communist Party of Byelorussia. From 4–27 February 1919, Miasnikian was chairman of the Central Executive Committee of the Socialist Soviet Republic of Byelorussia that briefly existed in January and February of that year. He was a member of the Central Committee of the Bolshevik Party for the short-lived Lithuanian–Belorussian Soviet Socialist Republic. When Nikolai Krylenko was appointed Supreme Commander in Chief of the Red Army, he appointed Miasnikian as his deputy.

In March 1921, following the February Uprising where forces of the Armenian Revolutionary Federation briefly overthrew Soviet authority in Armenia, the Bolshevik leadership in Moscow decided to appoint Miasnikian head of the newly installed government of the Armenian Soviet Socialist Republic. On his way to Armenia, he delivered Lenin's letter "To the Comrade Communists of Azerbaijan, Georgia, Armenia, Dagestan, and the Mountainous Republic" to the Caucasian Bolshevik leadership in Tiflis, which called on them to exercise moderation and slow down their transition to socialism.

After arriving in Soviet Armenia in May 1921 and taking leadership of the government, Miasnikian was faced with two urgent issues: the anti-Bolshevik rebellion in the southern region of Zangezur and the question of Mountainous Karabakh, an Armenian-populated region disputed between Soviet Armenia and Soviet Azerbaijan. Miasnikian engaged in negotiations with the rebels in Zangezur, offering a number of concessions in return for accepting Soviet authority in Armenia, but on June 3, 1921 the Kavbiuro (the Bolshevik Party's decision-making body in the Caucasus) resolved to suppress the rebellion. The rebels were defeated and fled into Persia in July.

The resolution adopted at the Kavbiuro meeting on June 3 (at which Miasnikian was present) included a point which stated that Mountainous Karabakh should be declared a part of Armenia. On June 12, Miasnikian signed a decree adopted by the Soviet Armenian government which stated that the Revkoms of Armenia and Azerbaijan had agreed that Mountainous Karabakh was now an inalienable part of Armenia. However, there was disagreement from the Azerbaijani side, which insisted on leaving the final resolution of the status of Karabakh for future Kavbiuro meetings. At a Kavbiuro meeting on July 4, 1921, Miasnikian and a majority of members voted to conduct a referendum in the Armenian-populated mountainous part of Karabakh and make it part of Armenia. Just the next day, Kavbiuro decided to revise the decision and adopt a new one whereby Mountainous Karabakh would become an autonomous region within the Azerbaijani SSR. The Central Committee of the Armenian Communist Party unsuccessfully protested the decision. Six months later, Miasnikian told the First Congress of the Armenian Communist Party that Azerbaijan had threatened to cut off Armenia's supply of kerosene if they demanded Karabakh. 

Miasnikian was instrumental in the formation of state institutions and economy of the republic. Miasnikian also initiated active work towards eradicating the illiteracy and developing local manufacturing in Armenia. He was succeeded as head of government of Soviet Armenia by Sargis Lukashin in January 1922. After the formation of the Transcaucasian SFSR in March 1922, Miasnikian held a number of leading positions in the federation's government, working from Tiflis. 

Miasnikian wrote several works about the theory of Marxism-Leninism, the history of the revolutionary movement, and Armenian literature. He began writing reviews for theater in 1906. His works about Armenian literature include the article "Mikael Nalbandian" and pamphlets on the poetry of Hovhannes Hovhannisyan and Hovhannes Tumanyan. In literature, Miasnikian criticized apolitical approaches to literature and the concept of "art for art's sake" in articles like "Philanthropy and its Lackeys" (1912).

Death
Miasnikian was killed in a mysterious plane crash on 22 March 1925, along with Solomon Mogilevsky, Georgi Atarbekov, the pilot and flight engineer. They had been on their way to Sukhumi for a communist conference in Abkhazia. Shortly after taking off from Tiflis, the Junkers F 13 aircraft caught fire. According to eyewitness reports, people were seen jumping to their deaths to escape the burning plane.

The cause of the fire was never established, despite separate investigatory commissions chaired by Lavrentiy Beria (first) and Karl Pauker (second and third). Nothing was found to be wrong with the plane mechanically. Leon Trotsky, who left Sukhumi for the funeral in Tiflis, was suspicious of the cause of the crash. Others who believed it was deliberate suspected Beria himself had organized it.

Legacy
Anastas Mikoyan called for reviving the memory of Miasnikian, alongside the writers Raffi, Raphael Patkanian, and Yeghishe Charents, in his March 1954 speech in Yerevan.

In 1976, a film directed by Frunze Dovlatyan about Miasnikian's life titled Yerkunk was released where Miasnikian is portrayed by Khoren Abrahamyan.

Several locations within the Soviet Union were named after him (including "Martuni", his nom de guerre): In Armenia, a city and two villages (in Gegharkunik and Armavir provinces); In Russia's Rostov Oblast, an Armenian-populated raion (district) is named after him; and in the disputed Nagorno-Karabakh Republic, a city and a province are called Martuni.

References

Notes

Citations

Further reading

Александр Фёдорович МЯСНИКОВ
Энциклопедия фонда "Хайазг" - Мясников Александр Фёдорович
Энцыкляпедыя Электронная

1886 births
1925 deaths
Politicians from Rostov-on-Don
People from Don Host Oblast
Armenian people from the Russian Empire
Old Bolsheviks
Communist Party of Byelorussia politicians
Communist Party of Armenia (Soviet Union) politicians
Central Committee of the Communist Party of the Soviet Union candidate members
Russian Constituent Assembly members
Socialist Soviet Republic of Byelorussia people
Lithuanian–Byelorussian Soviet Socialist Republic people
Central Executive Committee of the Soviet Union members
Armenian atheists
Armenian revolutionaries
Russian military personnel of World War I
Victims of aviation accidents or incidents in the Soviet Union
Heads of government of the Armenian Soviet Socialist Republic
First Secretaries of the Communist Party of the Transcaucasian SFSR
Victims of aviation accidents or incidents in 1925